"Forbidden Colours" is a 1983 song by David Sylvian and Ryuichi Sakamoto. The song is the vocal version of the theme from the Nagisa Oshima film Merry Christmas, Mr. Lawrence. It appears on the film's soundtrack album and was released as a single on Virgin Records in 1983 (the second collaborative single release by Sylvian and Sakamoto, following 1982's "Bamboo Houses").

Background 

The title of the song is taken from Japanese writer Yukio Mishima's 1953 novel Forbidden Colors; although not directly related to the film, both works include exploration of homosexual themes, specifically resistance to desires through faith in God.

In 1984 the track was re-recorded and released as the B-side to "Red Guitar", the lead single to Sylvian's first solo album Brilliant Trees and was later also included as a bonus track on certain editions of his 1987 album Secrets of the Beehive. 

Both Sakamoto and Sylvian have since recorded several interpretations of the song, both instrumental (under the title "Merry Christmas, Mr. Lawrence") and vocal. An orchestral version featuring vocals by Sylvian was included on Sakamoto's 1999 album Cinemage.

Sylvian said in an interview 2012 about the track:

Track listing
All music by Ryuichi Sakamoto; lyrics by David Sylvian on "Forbidden Colours", "Bamboo Houses" and "Bamboo Music".

7": Virgin / VS601 (UK) and 7" Picture Disc: Virgin / VSY601 (UK) 
Side one
 "Forbidden Colours" – 4:42
Side two
 "The Seed and the Sower" – 5:00

12": Virgin / VS601-12 (UK) 
Side one
 "Forbidden Colours" – 4:42
Side two
 "The Seed and the Sower" – 5:00
 "Last Regrets" – 2:40

1988 3" CD: Virgin / CDT18 (UK) 
 "Forbidden Colours" – 4.42
 "Bamboo Houses" – 5.26
 "Bamboo Music" – 5.38

Chart positions

Personnel
 Ryuichi Sakamoto – keyboards, programming
 David Sylvian – vocals, lyrics

Production
 Ryuichi Sakamoto – producer
 Recording and mixing – Ryuichi Sakamoto, Seigen Ono, Shinichi Tanaka
 Recording assistant – Michio Nakakoshi
 David Sylvian – artwork, cover design
 Yuka Fujii – photography

References

1983 singles
Songs written by David Sylvian
Songs written by Ryuichi Sakamoto
Virgin Records singles
David Sylvian songs
1983 songs
LGBT-related songs